is a town located in Aomori Prefecture, Japan. , the town had an estimated population of 4,258 in 2134 households, and a population density of 33 persons per km², in 1,779 households.

Geography
Yokohama occupies the northeastern coastline of Mutsu Bay, at the entrance to Shimokita Peninsula.

Neighbouring municipalities 
Aomori Prefecture
Mutsu
Higashidōri
Noheji
Rokkasho

Climate
The town has a cold maritime climate characterized by cool short summers and long cold winters with heavy snowfall (Köppen climate classification Cfb). The average annual temperature in Yokohama is 9.1 °C. The average annual rainfall is 1262 mm with September as the wettest month. The temperatures are highest on average in August, at around 21.9 °C, and lowest in January, at around -2.6 °C.

Demographics
Per Japanese census data, the population of Yokohama has declined over the past 60 years.

History
Finds of Jōmon pottery indicate that the area of Yokohama was inhabited for many thousands of years. The place name of "Yokohama" predates its more famous namesake in Kanagawa Prefecture, and can be found in Nanboku-chō period documents. The area around Yokohama was controlled by the Nambu clan from the Kamakura period and was part of Morioka Domain during the Edo period. During the post-Meiji restoration establishment of the modern municipalities system on 1 April 1889, it was proclaimed to be a village. Yokohama was elevated to town status on April 1, 1958.

Government
Yokohama has a mayor-council form of government with a directly elected mayor and a unicameral town council of ten members. Yokohama is part of Shimokita District which, together with the city of Mutsu, contributes three members to the Aomori Prefectural Assembly. In terms of national politics, the town is part of Aomori 2nd district of the lower house of the Diet of Japan.

Economy
The economy of Yokohama was traditionally heavily dependent on commercial fishing in Mutsu Bay, primarily for sea cucumber, the local specialty, as well as sea urchin roe and scallops. With regards to agriculture, rapeseed and potato farming predominates. Electrical power production via wind farms also contributes to the local economy.

Education
Yokohama has one public elementary school and one public middle school operated by the town government. The town does not have a high school.

Transportation

Railway
 East Japan Railway Company (JR East) - Ōminato Line
  -  -

Highway
  Shimokita Expressway

Noted people from Yokohama
Hiroko Nakano, politician

References

External links 

Official Website 

 
Towns in Aomori Prefecture
Populated coastal places in Japan